(born January 6, 1964 in Gifu, Gifu, Japan) is a Japanese baseball player. He won a bronze medal at the 1992 Summer Olympics. He has also coached the Japan national baseball team at the international level.

References
Yasunori Takami at Sports-Reference.com

1964 births
Living people
People from Gifu
Baseball players at the 1992 Summer Olympics
Olympic baseball players of Japan
Olympic medalists in baseball
Baseball players at the 1990 Asian Games

Medalists at the 1992 Summer Olympics
Olympic bronze medalists for Japan
Asian Games competitors for Japan
Aichi Institute of Technology alumni